Hemići (Cyrillic: Хемићи) is a village in the municipality of Donji Vakuf, Bosnia and Herzegovina.

Demographics 
According to the 2013 census, its population was 103.

References

Populated places in Donji Vakuf